Energy is an unincorporated community in Clarke County, Mississippi, United States.

The population was 27 in 1900.

Energy had a post office until 1910.

References

Unincorporated communities in Clarke County, Mississippi
Unincorporated communities in Mississippi